White Hall High School is a public high school located in White Hall, Arkansas, United States. White Hall serves  grades 912 for the White Hall School District.

It serves White Hall, sections of Pine Bluff, and Redfield. It also serves Jefferson.

History 
Initially the Dollarway School District (DSD) sent older white students to White Hall High and other area high schools, as it did not have its own high school for white students nor one for black students. In 1957 DSD opened its own high school for white children, Dollarway High School.

Athletics 
The White Hall Bulldogs compete in the 5A Central Division of the Arkansas Activities Association (AAA). The following AAA-sanctioned sports are offered:

Baseball (boys) 
Basketball (boys and girls)
Football (boys)
Golf (boys and girls)
Soccer (boys and girls)
Softball (girls)
Tennis (boys and girls) 
Track and field (boys and girls)
Volleyball (girls)
Band
E-Sports (Gamers)

Notable alumni

 Tyler Zuber, MLB Player (Kansas City Royals)

References

External links
 

Public high schools in Arkansas
Schools in Jefferson County, Arkansas